Robert Edwin Miller (born July 9, 1956) is a retired American basketball player.  He played collegiately at the University of Cincinnati and professionally for the National Basketball Association's San Antonio Spurs.

Miller, a 6'10" power forward from Louisville, Kentucky, played college basketball at Cincinnati from 1974 to 1978.  Following his college career, he was drafted by the Phoenix Suns in the fourth round of the 1978 NBA draft.  He would not make his NBA debut until January, 1984 when he appeared in two games for the San Antonio Spurs, recording four points and five rebounds in eight total minutes of action.  Miller also played for two seasons in the Continental Basketball Association (CBA) for the Louisville Catbirds and Cincinnati Slammers.  He averaged 9.5 points and 11.2 rebounds in 41 total CBA games.

References

1956 births
Living people
American men's basketball players
Basketball players from Louisville, Kentucky
Central High School (Louisville, Kentucky) alumni
Cincinnati Bearcats men's basketball players
Cincinnati Slammers players
Louisville Catbirds players
Phoenix Suns draft picks
Power forwards (basketball)
San Antonio Spurs players